Ust-Dzhegutinsky District (Cögetey Ayağı rayon;) is an administrative and a municipal district (raion), one of the ten in the Karachay-Cherkess Republic, Russia. It is located in the northeast of the republic. Its administrative center is the town of Ust-Dzheguta. As of the 2010 Census, the total population of the district was 50,641, with the population of Ust-Dzheguta accounting for 60.4% of that number.

Administrative and municipal status
Within the framework of administrative divisions, Ust-Dzhegutinsky District is one of the ten in the Karachay-Cherkess Republic and has administrative jurisdiction over one town (Ust-Dzheguta) and nine rural localities. As a municipal division, the district is incorporated as Ust-Dzhegutinsky Municipal District. The town of Ust-Dzheguta is incorporated into an urban settlement, while the nine rural localities are incorporated into seven rural settlements within the municipal district. The town of Ust-Dzheguta serves as the administrative center of both the administrative and municipal district.

References

Notes

Sources

Districts of Karachay-Cherkessia
